Sotero Cosme "Teroy" Hidalgo Laurel II (September 27, 1918 – September 16, 2009) was a Filipino politician and educator who served as a Senator from 1987 until 1992, including a period as President pro tempore from 1990 until 1991. Laurel was the son of the former President of the Philippines José P. Laurel and the older brother of former Vice President Salvador Laurel. Laurel was nicknamed "Teroy."

Early life
Laurel was the third oldest son of former President José P. Laurel, he was also the grandson of the late Sotero Remoquillo Laurel. He was born on September 27, 1918. He earned his law degrees from the University of the Philippines and was a member of the Upsilon Sigma Phi fraternity. He later obtained a master's degree from the University of Santo Tomas. Laurel then went to the United States where he studied international and constitutional law at Harvard University
and Georgetown University.

Career
Laurel taught law at Lyceum of the Philippines, the Philippine Law School, and Far Eastern University. He also aligned himself from the school policies to found the "Student Varsitarian" in 1953, a reputable campus organization for students hails from different provinces. Laurel served as the president of the Philippine Association of Colleges and Universities (PACU) from 1963 to 1965. He also became the chairman of the Board of Trustees of the Lyceum of the Philippines University System. He was a 1986 recipient of the Ordre des Palmes Académiques of France, which is bestowed on educators and academics.

As Senator from 1987 to 1992, Laurel opposed the extension of the U.S. Naval Base Subic Bay and the Clark Air Base, leading to their closure in 1991. He was a member of the so-called "Magnificent 12" who voted against the extension. He was also the Chairman of the Senate Committee on Commerce and Industry and was the Senate President Pro-Tempore from 1990 to 1991. He was the oldest serving senator also at that time.

Laurel established Lyceum of the Philippines University–Batangas and Lyceum of the Philippines University-Laguna.

Death
Sotero Laurel died of cancer on September 16, 2009, at the age of 90. one month after the death of former President Cory Aquino. He was survived by his wife, Lorna, their eight children, and two sisters - Rose L. Avancena and Nita L. Yupangco. Laurel was laid in state in Manila Memorial Park in Parañaque. Laurel was predeceased by his sister, Nene L. Guinto, and brothers former House Speaker José B. Laurel Jr.; former Vice President Salvador "Doy" Laurel; former Philippine Ambassador to Japan José S. Laurel III; banker, Mariano Laurel; and Arsenio "Dodjie" Laurel, a race car driver.

References

1918 births
2009 deaths
Deaths from cancer in the Philippines
Presidents pro tempore of the Senate of the Philippines
Senators of the 8th Congress of the Philippines
Academic staff of Far Eastern University
University of the Philippines alumni
University of Santo Tomas alumni
Sotero
People from Batangas
Nacionalista Party politicians
Academic staff of Lyceum of the Philippines University
Recipients of the Ordre des Palmes Académiques
Harvard Law School alumni
Children of presidents of the Philippines
Burials at the Manila Memorial Park – Sucat
Georgetown University Law Center alumni